The 1941 Indiana State Sycamores football team was an American football team that represented Indiana State University as a member of the Indiana Intercollegiate Conference during the 1941 college football season. In its 13th season under head coach Walter E. Marks, the team compiled a 5–2–1 record. The team played its home games in Terre Haute, Indiana.

Three Indiana State players were selected by The Indianapolis News to its All-Indiana college football teams: center Paul Selge (2nd team); tackle Arnold Tyler (3rd team); and guard Harry Woodard.

Schedule

References

Indiana State
Indiana State Sycamores football seasons
Indiana State Sycamores football